Benito Corghi (26 May 1938 – 5 August 1976) was an Italian long-distance truckdriver, who was a victim of Border Troops of the German Democratic Republic on a border crossing point.

Background

Benito Corghi was an Italian long-distance truckdriver. In the morning of 5 August 1976 he crossed the border crossing at  Hirschberg/Rudolphstein at the Bundesautobahn 9 into West Germany. Then he was going back as a pedestrian to pick up papers he forgot on the East German side. This was not allowed. When a guard shouted at him and ordered him to raise his hands, he did not understand, turned around and attempted to walk back, whereupon he was shot.

On the next day, the authorities of the GDR formally apologized for the "tragic accident". It was the only time in GDR history that such a formal apology was issued for a deadly occurrence along the inner-German border.

The shooter was acquitted in 1994 by the District Court (Landgericht) of Gera.

References

1938 births
1976 deaths
Deaths by firearm in East Germany
1976 in East Germany